Plant cream is an imitation of dairy cream made without dairy products, and thus vegan. It is typically produced by grinding plant material into a thick liquid to which gums are added to imitate the viscosity and mouthfeel of cream. Common varieties are soy cream, coconut cream, and cashew cream. It is used as a dessert topping and in many other dishes and beverages.

Some imitation cream contains a mixture of non-dairy and dairy ingredients. For instance, Cool Whip includes some milk; Elmlea sells both fully plant-based and mixed imitation creams.

As of 1998, plant cream was similar in price to double cream but more expensive than single cream.

Nutrition

A 1998 study comparing vegan cream with dairy cream found that calories and fat content were similar, but that the vegan cream was lower in saturated fat and higher in polyunsaturated fat. The vegan cream contained low vitamin A, no vitamin D, and lower calcium than dairy single cream.

See also

 Plant milk
 Cream
 Whipped cream#Imitation whipped cream

References

Animal product analogs
Cream